The Ontario men's provincial floorball team is the men's provincial floorball team of Ontario, and a member of Floorball Canada. Ontario's men's team is currently ranked 1st in Canada at floorball, based on their performance at the 2010 Canadian Floorball Championships.

Ontario maintains a strong rivalry in floorball with Quebec. The team is organized by Ontario Floorball.

Team Roster

Canadian Nationals

Floorball
Ontario